The United East Conference (UEC), formerly known as the North Eastern Athletic Conference (NEAC), is an intercollegiate athletic conference affiliated with the NCAA's Division III. Member institutions are located in the Mid-Atlantic region of the United States.

History
The North Eastern Athletic Conference was founded in 2004. The original membership consisted of  the following schools: Baptist Bible College (now known as Clarks Summit University), Bard College, Philadelphia Biblical University (now known as Cairn University), Cazenovia College, Chestnut Hill College, D'Youville College, Keuka College, Keystone College, Penn State-Berks, Polytechnic University (later known as the Polytechnic Institute of New York University and now fully merged into NYU as its Tandon School of Engineering), State University of New York at Purchase (SUNY Purchase), and Villa Julie College (now known as Stevenson University).

At the conclusion of the 2006–07 season, the NEAC had a shifting of membership losing five institutions and gaining three new members. The departing members were: Bard, Chestnut Hill, Polytechnic (N.Y.), SUNY Purchase, and Stevenson; while the new members were: Penn State-Harrisburg, Wells College, and Wilson College. The NEAC consisted of 10 members, effective the 2007-08 season.

At the conclusion of the 2007–08 season, the NEAC lost an additional three institutions while gaining two new members. The departing members were: Baptist Bible, Cairn, and Keystone (all to the Pennsylvania Athletic Conference, currently named the Colonial States Athletic Conference). The new members were State University of New York at Cobleskill (SUNY Cobleskill) and State University of New York Institute of Technology (SUNYIT); the latter is now known as SUNY Polytechnic Institute (SUNY Poly). The NEAC consisted of bringing the total to nine members, effective the 2008-09 season.

The NEAC accepted four associate member institutions for the 2008–09 season; they were: Medaille College (for men's and women's lacrosse), Rutgers University–Camden (for men's golf), State University of New York at Oneonta (for men's tennis), and the University of Dallas (in men's soccer, men's golf, men's & women's cross country, and men's & women's basketball). The University of Dallas also competed in women's volleyball to the NEAC in the 2009–10 season.

At the conclusion of the 2008–09 season, the NEAC lost an additional founding member in D'Youville. In the 2009–10 season, the NEAC welcomed three additional new members in the College of Saint Elizabeth, Penn State-Abington, and State University of New York at Morrisville (SUNY Morrisville). The NEAC had accepted four associate member institutions in that same season. Additionally, the NEAC also began a three year partnership with the North Atlantic Conference in four sports: baseball; women's lacrosse; and men's and women's tennis. Departing the NEAC at the conclusion of the 2009–10 season were associate members the University of Dallas and SUNY Oneonta.

In the 2010–11 season, the NEAC welcomed by Gallaudet University. In the 2011–12 season, the NEAC gained one new full member in Lancaster Bible College while Rutgers–Camden (already an associate member in men's golf) joined the NEAC in men's tennis. The partnership between the NEAC and the NAC ended for baseball and women's lacrosse following the 2011–12 season.

At the conclusion of the 2012–13 season, the NEAC lost one full member in Penn State Harrisburg. In the 2013–14 season, the NEAC added Cedar Crest College as an associate member for women's swimming. Beginning in the 2014–15 season, the NEAC accepted two new full members in Bryn Athyn College and Pennsylvania College of Technology. Also in that same season, Wilson College, a former women's college that became co-educational in the 2013–14 school year, began a men's athletic program, and four other schools became men's volleyball associates.

Changes in the NEAC membership have continued to the present. On August 30, 2017, Bryn Athyn and Wilson announced that they would leave the NEAC for the Colonial States Athletic Conference effective with the 2018–19 school year. The next change of membership came in 2019–20 with the return of Penn State Harrisburg and the departure of Saint Elizabeth for the Colonial States Athletic Conference. In July 2020, the NEAC lost four members, with Keuka departing for the Empire 8 Conference and Cazenovia, SUNY Cobleskill, and SUNY Poly leaving for the North Atlantic Conference. The NEAC membership will return to 9 in 2021 with the arrival of St. Mary's College of Maryland.

On August 2, 2021, the conference revealed that they were rebranding themselves as the United East Conference. The conference said that the name “United East” was chosen because it describes the conference’s commitment to collaborate on a shared mission in a diverse environment while also still giving a nod to the geographical placement of the member schools.

On December 19, 2022, the United East Conference and the Colonial States Athletic Conference announced their intent to merge beginning with the 2023-24 academic year.

Chronlogical timeline

 2004 - In 2004, the United East was founded as the North Eastern Athletic Conference (NEAC). Charter members included Baptist Bible College (now Clarks Summit University), Bard College, Philadelphia Biblical University (now Cairn University), Cazenovia College, Chestnut Hill College, D'Youville College, Keuka College, Keystone College, Penn State-Berks, Polytechnic University (later the Polytechnic Institute of New York University and now the NYU Tandon School of Engineering), the State University of New York at Purchase (SUNY Purchase), and Villa Julie College (now Stevenson University), effective beginning the 2004-05 academic year.
 2007 - Five institutions left the NEAC to join their respective new home primary conferences: Bard, Polytechnic (N.Y.) and SUNY Purchase to the Skyline Conference, Chestnut Hill to the Division II ranks of the National Collegiate Athletic Association (NCAA) and the Central Atlantic Collegiate Conference (CACC), and Stevenson to the Capital Athletic Conference (CAC), all effective after the 2006-07 academic year.
 2007 - Pennsylvania State University at Harrisburg, Wells College and Wilson College joined the NEAC, effective in the 2007-08 academic year.
 2008 - Clarks Summit, Cairn, and Keystone left the NEAC to join the Pennsylvania Athletic Conference (PAC; currently named the Colonial States Athletic Conference (CSAC)), effective after the 2007-08 academic year.
 2008 - The State University of New York at Cobleskill (SUNY Cobleskill) and the State University of New York Institute of Technology (SUNYIT, now the SUNY Polytechnic Institute, or SUNY Poly) joined the NEAC, effective in the 2008-09 academic year.
 2008 - Four institutions joined the NEAC as associate members: Medaille College for men's and women's lacrosse, Rutgers University–Camden for men's golf, the State University of New York at Oneonta for men's tennis, and the University of Dallas for men's soccer, men's golf, men's & women's cross country, and men's & women's basketball (despite the latter's conference affiliation as an all-sports member remains as a D-III Independent school), effective in the 2008-09 academic year.
 2009 - D'Youville left the NEAC to join the Allegheny Mountain Collegiate Conference (AMCC), effective after the 2008-09 academic year.
 2009 - The College of Saint Elizabeth (now Saint Elizabeth University), Penn State University at Abington and the State University of New York at Morrisville (SUNY Morrisville) joined the NEAC, effective in the 2009-10 academic year.
 2009 - Dallas added women's volleyball to its NEAC associate membership, effective in the 2009 fall season (2009-10 academic year).
 2009 - The NEAC had accepted four associate member institutions in that same season. Additionally, the NEAC also began a three year partnership with the North Atlantic Conference in four sports: baseball, women's lacrosse, and men's and women's tennis.
 2010 - Two institutions left the NEAC as associate members: Dallas for most sports sponsored during its tenure and SUNY Oneonta for men's tennis, effective after the 2009-10 academic year.
 2010 - Gallaudet University joined the NEAC, effective in the 2010-11 academic year.
 2011 - Lancaster Bible College joined the NEAC, effective in the 2011-12 academic year.
 2011 - Rutgers–Camden added men's tennis to its NEAC associate membership, effective in the 2012 spring season (2011-12 academic year).
 2012 - The partnership between the NEAC and the NAC ended for baseball and women's lacrosse, effective after the 2011-12 academic year.
 2012 - Hilbert College joined the NEAC as an associate member for men's lacrosse, effective in the 2013 spring season (2012-13 academic year).
 2013 - Penn State–Harrisburg left the NEAC, effective after the 2012-13 academic year.
 2013 - Cedar Crest College joined the NEAC as an associate member for women's swimming, effective in the 2013-14 academic year.
 2014 - Rutgers–Camden left the NEAC as an associate member for men's tennis, effective in the 2014 spring season (2013-14 academic year).
 2014 - Wilson (Pa.) added men's sports into its athletic program, effective in the 2014-15 academic year.
 2014 - Bryn Athyn College and the Pennsylvania College of Technology (Penn College) joined the NEAC, effective in the 2014-15 academic year.
 2014 - The NEAC added men's volleyball along with four institutions as associate members for that sport (Hilbert and Medaille, former full member D'Youville, and Pennsylvania State University at Altoona), effective in the 2015 spring season (2014-15 academic year).
 2017 - D'Youville, Hilbert, Medaille and Penn State–Altoona left the NEAC as associate members for men's volleyball, effective after the 2017 spring season (2016-17 academic year).
 2018 - Bryn Athyn and Wilson (Pa.) left the NEAC to join the CSAC, effective after the 2017-18 academic year.
 2019 - Saint Elizabeth (N.J.) left the NEAC to join the CSAC, effective after the 2018-19 academic year.
 2019 - Penn State–Harrisburg re-joined back to the NEAC, effective in the 2019-20 academic year.
 2020 - Four institutions left the NEAC to join their respective new home primary conferences: Cazenovia, SUNY Cobleskill and SUNY Poly for the NAC, and Keuka for the Empire 8, all effective after the 2019-20 academic year.
 2021 - Cedar Crest left the NEAC as an associate member for women's swimming, effective after the 2020-21 academic year.
 2021 - St. Mary's College of Maryland joined the NEAC, effective in the 2021-22 academic year.
 2021 - Rosemont College joined the NEAC as an associate member for men's golf (alongside former full member Wilson (Pa.) re-joining as an associate), effective in the 2021-22 academic year.
 2021 - On August 2, 2021, the NEAC has been rebranded as the United East Conference, effective in the 2021-22 academic year.
 2022 - On March 1, 2022, SUNY Morrisville announced that it will leave the United East to join the NAC, effective beginning the 2023-24 academic year.
 2022 - On July 6, 2022, United East Conference announced that Clark Summit joined the conference as an associate member in men's golf and men's tennis starting in the 2022–23 academic year.
 2022 - On August 15, 2022, Wells announced that it will leave the United East to join the AMCC, effective beginning the 2023-24 academic year.
 2022 - On December 19, 2022, the United East Conference and the Colonial States Athletic Conference announced their intent to merge beginning with the 2023-24 academic year.

Member schools

Current members 
The United East currently has nine full members, all but three are public schools:

Notes

Associate members 
The United East currently has six associate members, all but one are private schools:

Notes

Former members 
The United East had 20 former full members, all but three are private schools:

Notes

Former associate members
The United East had seven former associate members, all but two were private schools:

Notes

Membership timeline

Sports

The UEC sponsors championships in the following sports:

Notes

Men's sponsored sports by school

Notes

Men's varsity sports not sponsored by the United East that are played by United East schools

Women's sponsored sports by school

Notes

Women's varsity sports not sponsored by the United East that are played by United East schools

References

External links